John George may refer to:

Military
John George (Royal Navy officer) (died 1690), English naval officer and captain of HMS Rose
John St George (1812–1891),  British Army officer
John George (officer of arms) (1930–2012), Scottish officer of arms
John George, author of Shots Fired In Anger, see Merrill's Marauders

Politics and nobility

Germany
John George, Marquis of Montferrat (1488–1533), last Marquess of Montferrat of the Palaeologus dynasty
John George, Elector of Brandenburg (1525–1598), Prince-elector of the Margraviate of Brandenburg
John George I, Prince of Anhalt-Dessau (1567–1618), German prince of the House of Ascania and ruler of the unified principality of Anhalt
John George, Prince of Hohenzollern-Hechingen (1577–1623), first Prince of Hohenzollern-Hechingen
John George I, Elector of Saxony (1585–1656), Elector of Saxony, 1611–1656
John George II, Elector of Saxony (1613–1680), Elector of Saxony, 1656–1680
John George II, Prince of Anhalt-Dessau (1627–1693), German prince of the House of Ascania and ruler of the principality of Anhalt-Dessau
John George III, Elector of Saxony (1647–1691), Elector of Saxony, 1680–1691
John George IV, Elector of Saxony (1668–1694), Elector of Saxony, 1691–1694

U.S.
John George (Virginia colonist) (1603–1679), Virginia colonist, landowner, soldier and burgess in the Virginia House of Burgesses
John George Jr. (born 1946), American businessman, farmer, and politician in the Massachusetts House of Representatives
John George (California politician), American politician, activist, and human rights pioneer

Other political figures
John George (died 1677) (1594–1677), English politician who sat in the House of Commons in 1640
Sir John George (Conservative politician) (1901–1972), UK Conservative politician
John Hannibal George (1901–1996), New Zealand politician
John George of Ohlau, Duke of Oława, Wołów

Sports
John George (athlete) (1882–1962), British athlete at the 1908 Summer Olympics
Johnny George, American baseball player
John George (BMX rider) (born 1958), American BMX racing pioneer
John George (racing driver) (born 1961), British racing driver
John Tibar George (born 2000), Tanzanian footballer

Others
John George (lawyer) (1804–1881), Solicitor general for Ireland
John George (actor) (1898–1968), American film actor
John George (magician) (born 1971), American magician

Other uses
John George Psychiatric Pavilion, known as John George, in San Leandro, California, named after the local politician of the same name